Aleksander Kaszkiewicz (also Alyaksandr Kashkevіch, ; born on 23 September 1949) is the Bishop of the Diocese of Grodno, a Catholic diocese centered in the city of Grodno (Belarus).
 
Kaszkiewicz graduated from the Theological Seminary in Kaunas and was ordained to the priesthood on 30 May 1976. After his ordination he worked as a parish priest in Panevėžys and in the parish of the Holy Spirit in Vilnius (from 1981). On 13 April 1991 Pope John Paul II appointed Kaszkiewicz to the newly formed Diocese of Grodno. On 23 May 1991 he was ordained a bishop, consecrated by Archbishop Tadeusz Kondrusiewicz. His episcopal motto is Jesu in te confido (Jesus, I trust in You) taken from the Divine Mercy image.

On 14 June 2006 Kaszkiewicz was elected chairman of the Conference of Catholic Bishops of Belarus. He is also the head of the Council of Youth Affairs and the Council for Catholic Education.

External links
 https://web.archive.org/web/20031122155541/http://catholic.by/port/conference/kashkevich.htm
 http://www.catholic-hierarchy.org/bishop/bkasz.html
 http://www.gcatholic.org/dioceses/diocese/grod0.htm

21st-century Roman Catholic bishops in Belarus
Living people
1949 births
People from Eišiškės